Bobby Haarms (8 March 1934 – 6 June 2009) was a Dutch professional football player and coach.

Career

Playing career
Haarms joined the youth team of Ajax in 1947 and made his professional debut in 1952. Between 1952 and 1960, Haarms made 58 appearances for Ajax, scoring once, before he had to retire due to a knee injury.

Coaching career
Haarms was an Assistant Manager at Ajax from 1967 to 1981, and was Intermin Manager briefly in 1974. He scouted for Ajax between 1981 and 1982, before leaving to become Manager of VV Aalsmeer. He became Assistant at FC Volendam from 1984 to 1986, before returning to Ajax, where he was once again an Assistant Manager from 1986 to 2000 (minus a second spell as Interim Manager from 1988 to 1989).

Later life and death
Haarms died on 6 June 2009, aged 75.

References

1934 births
2009 deaths
Dutch footballers
Dutch football managers
AFC Ajax players
AFC Ajax managers
AFC Ajax non-playing staff
Footballers from Amsterdam

Association footballers not categorized by position
FC Volendam non-playing staff